Myrtle may refer to:

Plants
Myrtaceae, the myrtle family 
Myrtus, the myrtle genus
 List of plants known as myrtle, including a list of trees and plants known as myrtle

In geography

Canada
 Myrtle, Ontario, a community

United States
 Myrtle, Kansas, a former settlement
 Myrtle, Minnesota, a city
 Myrtle, Mississippi, a town
 Myrtle, Missouri, an unincorporated community
 Myrtle, West Virginia, an unincorporated community
 Myrtle Creek (Curry County, Oregon), a stream
 Myrtle Creek (South Umpqua River tributary), a stream in Oregon

People and fictional characters
 Myrtle (given name), including a list of people and fictional characters with the given name or nickname
 Chip Myrtle (born 1945), American National Football League player

Roads
 Myrtle Avenue, New York City
 Myrtle Avenue, Hounslow, in the London Borough of Hounslow
 Myrtle Road, Sheffield, England, former home ground of The Wednesday Football Club on the street of the same name

Other uses
 , various United States Navy ships
 Myrtle (sternwheeler), a steamboat in Oregon in the early 20th century
 "The Myrtle", an Italian literary fairy tale
 "Myrtle" (Superstore), an episode of TV series Superstore
 Myrtle (color), a shade of the color green

See also
 Myrtle Bank (disambiguation)
 Myrtle Beach, South Carolina
 Myrtle Creek (disambiguation), includes both communities and actual creeks
 Myrtle Grove (disambiguation)
 Myrtle Hill (disambiguation)
 Myrtles Plantation, Louisiana
 Myrtle Point, Oregon
 Myrtle Township (disambiguation)